Desmond Charles Lancaster (16 July 1937 – October 2000) was an English professional footballer who played as a striker.

References

External links
Des Lancaster career stats at the Post-War Players Database

1937 births
2000 deaths
Footballers from Burnley
English footballers
Association football forwards
Burnley F.C. players
Darlington F.C. players
Tranmere Rovers F.C. players
Nelson F.C. players
English Football League players